Hestad is a village in Sunnfjord Municipality in Vestland county, Norway. The village is located on the northern shore of the river Gaula (between the lakes Viksdalsvatnet and Hestadfjorden—the river runs through both lakes). The peninsula juts south into the river, separating the two lakes. The forested peninsula is the site of Hestad Chapel and it has been a church site for centuries. There was originally an old stave church on the site that was built in the 14th century.

There is a bridge from the peninsula to the south side of the river, part of the Fv.610 highway.

References

Villages in Vestland
Sunnfjord